Thomas Hele (6 September 1630 – 13 September 1665) of Wigborow, Somerset, was a Member of Parliament for Plympton Erle in Devon from 1661 to 1665.

Origins
Hele was the eldest son and heir apparent of Sir Thomas Hele, 1st Baronet (died 1670), of Flete, Holbeton in Devon, by his first wife Penelope Johnson, daughter and co-heiress of Emorbe (Eniorbe(?)) Johnson of Wigborow in Somerset.

Career
In 1661 he was elected Member of Parliament for Plympton Erle in the Cavalier Parliament. He was commissioner  for assessment for  Devon from 1661 and for Somerset  from 1665.

Marriage
Thomas married Amy Luttrell, a daughter  of Thomas Luttrell of Dunster Castle, Somerset, but left no children.

Death and burial
He predeceased his father and died at Wigborough  at the age of 35 and was buried at South Petherton. His monument survives in Holbeton Church.

References

English MPs 1661–1679
1630 births
1665 deaths
Members of the Parliament of England for Plympton Erle
Heirs apparent who never acceded